Baguley Hall is a 14th-century timber-framed building in Baguley, Greater Manchester, North West England.

A former country house, historically in Cheshire, it is now Grade I-listed and a Scheduled Ancient Monument.

History
The current hall may be on the site of an earlier hall house, possibly dating from the 11th or 12th century. 
11th or 12th century: An aisled-timber hall was built on the site. (Archaeological excavations in the 1980s unearthed its remains). 
14th century, first half: The current hall was built by Sir William de Baguley and possibly completed either by his son, John de Baguley, or more likely by his grandson and heir, Sir William Legh, entirely of timber with wattle and daub walls, probably the oldest timber great hall surviving in England: it used timbers of unusual size. 
15th century: The north wing was built in timber, elements of which survive. It replaced previous tithe barns.
16th century: The west side timber-framed porch was added.
Late 17th century: The south wing was added, in brick, replacing a chamber block which was added to the aisled-hall before the early 14th century.
18th century: The north wing was rebuilt in brick. The south chamber block was replaced by a brick-built south wing.
19th century: The west side timber-framed porch was partially rebuilt.
Early 20th century: The hall was used as a farm building.
Circa World War II: The hall was also known in the area as Maher's Farm which grew and sold vegetables.
Circa 1948 and after: Its estate was built over, becoming part of Wythenshawe. The hall was abandoned, and its former grounds became covered with dense bramble and other wild vegetation, which was cleared out with local volunteer help.
1970s: Maintenance started; for a long time in and after the 1970s the hall was covered in a big corrugated iron shed while its timber was exposed and treated against woodworm and dry rot.
April 2013: The hall remains closed to the public; its grounds are kept tidy.

Ownership
Baguley Hall was in the possession of the de Baguleys and later the Legh family for about 400 years. Sir William de Baguley's daughter, Isabel, married Sir John Legh of Booths, near Knutsford. Her son, Sir William Legh, succeeded and the estate remained in the possession of the Leghs until the latter part of the 17th century. The last male heir was Edward Legh who married Eleanor, daughter of William Tatton of Wythenshawe Hall. They had three daughters and Baguley was leased to the Viscounts Allen until 1749 when the estate was bought by Joseph Jackson of Rostherne, whose family married into the Leighs of West Hall, High Legh. Jackson left it in his will to the Revd Millington Massey from whom it was inherited by his daughter, before being conveyed by the trustees of her marriage settlement to Thomas William Tatton, via his son Thomas Egerton Tatton to Robert Henry Grenville Tatton.

Bought by Manchester Corporation in 1926. Since 1968 the building has been owned by HM Government. The Ministry of Works initiated the 1971 to 1982 restoration program. The hall is currently under the guardianship of the Department for Digital, Culture, Media and Sport. The  structure and grounds are maintained by Historic England. The hall is listed on the Buildings at Risk Register, rating its condition as "fair".

See also

Baguley
Grade I listed buildings in Greater Manchester
Listed buildings in Manchester-M23
Scheduled Monuments in Greater Manchester

References

External links

1927 air view of Hall Lane and Blackcarr Road area: note farm workers' cottages and farm buildings west of Baguley Hall, which was then called Maher's Farm and used for market gardening. South of the railway note different route of Hall Lane.

Grade I listed buildings in Manchester
Scheduled monuments in Greater Manchester
Manor houses in England
Buildings and structures in Cheshire